This list of Welsh saints includes Christian saints with Welsh connections, either because they were of Welsh origin and ethnicity or because they travelled to Wales from their own homeland and became noted in their hagiography for their work there.

The pagan Celts of Britain had already been extensively Christianized during the Roman period: although only four victims of Diocletian's persecution are now known (Saints Alban, "Amphibalus", and Julius and Aaron), Britons met the pagan Saxon invaders largely as Christians prior to being driven back to Wales, Cornwall, and Brittany. The family of Vortigern, which continued to hold Powys in the early medieval period, produced numerous saints. Although they largely refrained from missionizing among the Germans, Welsh refugees and missionaries were responsible for the Christianization of Ireland and Brittany.

The title of "saint" was used quite broadly in the Celtic churches. More often, the title was given to the founder of any ecclesiastical settlement, which would thenceforth be known as their llan. Such communities were organized on tribal models: founding saints were almost invariably lesser members of local dynasties and their successors chosen from among their kin. The golden age of such establishments was the 6th century, when the "Three Saintly Families of Wales"—those of the invading Irish Brychan and Northerners Cunedda and Caw—displaced many of the local Silurian rulers in favor of their families and clans. By some estimates, these traditions produced over 800 pre-congregational saints venerated locally in Wales, but invasions by Saxons, Irishmen, Vikings, Normans, and others destroyed many ecclesiastical records. Similarly, the distance from Rome, suspicion of Celtic Christianity, and the relative disconnect of the local sees from Rome has left only two Welsh saints in the General Roman Calendar: Saints David (Dewi) and Winifred (Gwenffrewi).

List of saints

Other commemorations
 29 May: The translation of Saint Dyfrig
 6 June: Y Trisaint, the Three Saints
 22 June: The decollation of Saint Winifred
 26 June: The translation of Saint Brynach
 1 or 2 July: Gwyl y Gwlaw
 9 September: Gwyl y Ddelw Fyw, the Living Image
 23 September: The ordination of Saint Padarn
 21 October: Gwyl y Gweryddon, the Eleven Thousand Virgins
 3 November: The translation of Saint Winifred
 11 December: Dydd Ilas Llywelyn, the day on which Llywelyn was slain

See also
 Children of Brychan
 List of Breton saints
 List of Cornish saints
 List of Irish saints
 List of Anglo-Saxon saints
 List of Northumbrian saints

References

External links

 Welsh Saints at Everything2
 List of Celtic Saints at Celtic Christianity
 List of early Welsh Churches at Celtic Christianity

Lists of saints by place
Saints
 
Saints